Crown copyright is a type of copyright protection. It subsists in works of the governments of some Commonwealth realms and provides special copyright rules for the Crown, i.e. government departments and (generally) state entities. Each Commonwealth realm has its own Crown copyright regulations. There are therefore no common regulations that apply to all or a number of those countries. There are some considerations being made in Canada, UK, Australia and New Zealand regarding the "reuse of Crown-copyrighted material, through new licences".

Crown copyright by country

Australia 
The Copyright Act 1968 (Cth) is the single Act mandating copyright policy for government and non-government works in Australia. Sections 176(2) and 177 of the Act provide that the Australian Government or a government of an Australian state or territory owns copyright in an original literary, dramatic, musical or artistic work:
 made by or under the direction or control of that government, or
 first published in Australia by or under the direction or control of that government.
Copyright in such copyright material subsists until 50 years after the calendar year in which the material is made (s. 180).

Copyright in legislation and court or tribunal judgments, orders or awards is not infringed by making one copy of the whole of a work or part of it, provided the copy is not sold for a price that exceeds the actual costs of copying (s. 182A(3)).

An extensive review was carried out in 2004 and the findings were published in 2005 in the Copyright Law Review Committee's report. The chief recommendation was to end the distinction between the Crown and other copyright holders. In particular, the committee was "emphatic" that the Crown should lose its unique position of gaining copyright over material whenever it is the first publisher of such material. For example, a previously unpublished short story, upon being published in a government work, would cease to belong to the author and would instead become Crown copyright, denying the author any future royalties or rights to it. The 2005 report issued by Australia's Copyright Law Review Committee supports a repeal of Crown copyright provisions, which would "respect statutory provisions respecting employer ownership of works authored by employees and contractual arrangements for assigning copyright in commissioned works." By 2009, there were recommendations to change Crown copyright, allowing Crown copyrighted works to be licensed and given open access.

In 2009, the Victorian Government used Crown copyright to deny public access to data about the Black Saturday bushfires.

Canada
Normally, copyright in Canada "exists for the life of the author/creator, the remainder of the calendar year in which he is deceased, plus fifty years after the end of that calendar year". For Crown copyright however, there is a slight difference. Canadian Crown copyright is based on the concept of royal prerogative and "is not subject to the usual statutory copyright term". This prerogative is referenced at the outset of section 12 of the Copyright Act, which states that this section is made "Without prejudice to any rights or privileges of the Crown". Crown copyright covers all works that are "prepared or published by or under the direction or control of Her Majesty or any government department." In this way, "work produced by government departments, whether published or unpublished, may be protected either permanently or at the whim of the Crown". Subsequently, Crown copyright can be, in certain cases, "said to be perpetual...and not to lapse through non-use or non-assertion", and that a "right to certain works by prerogative amounts to a perpetual term of copyright protection". One example is where the "Arms of Canada as designed in 1921 and revised in 1957...[and] as revised in 1994...are protected under the Trade-marks Act and the Copyright Act", maintaining Crown copyright long after the normal 50-year period. Crown copyright exists for a variety of reasons, such as to ensure accuracy and integrity, to control symbols used to identify the Crown and its agents, as well as to supervise and control the publication of government works as the public's trustee.

In Canada, Crown copyright also applies to "primary law, but there are certain circumstances however when reproduction is allowed. The reproduction of statutes, consolidations of legislation, judicial reasons for judgments, and administrative tribunal decisions is covered by the Reproduction of Federal Law Order" the reproduction of primary law is also permissible as long as it is represented as a reproduction and is accurate. There is also open access online to versions of case law and statutes. Canada has implemented a variety of open data portals for GIS data as well as a geographical information license. In Canada, open data projects can also provide some content. Aside from specialized GIS licensing, license negotiations and agreements must be made to the Crown Copyright and Licensing department. Anyone in need of crown copyrighted material must submit a request for permission. Those seeking printed works may submit a request on publications.gc.ca.

Exceptions
While raw data is free from copyright protection – the creation of any work based on raw data (for example, in a geographical information system) is protected.

E-petition and review
There was an e-petition submitted to the House of Commons in 2017, which asserts that the Canadian Crown Copyright protocol needs to be updated to allow access and distribution rights to Canadians. The e-petition argues that "access to government information and the ability to distribute and encourage its reuse" is critical to society. The petition also states that Crown copyright issues have prevented libraries from engaging in the access and preservation of government information. Following the 2017 petition, the House of Commons formally responded and highlighted the review of the Copyright Act, which began in June 2018 and will resume September 2018.

Specific terms and conditions are as follows:

New Zealand
Crown copyright in New Zealand is defined by Sections 2(1), 26 and 27 of the Copyright Act 1994. The Crown is the first owner of any copyright subsisting in any work created by a person who is employed or engaged by the Crown, under a contract of service, apprenticeship, or a contract for services. It covers works of the King in right of New Zealand, Ministers of the Crown, offices of Parliament and government departments. The term is 100 years. Crown copyright would apply as long as no other copyright agreement had been made. In 2001, primary law and other official works were removed from Crown copyright protection. Like Australia, New Zealand is considering the implementation of open licenses for works protected by Crown copyright.

Exceptions
For Crown entities and state-owned enterprises, regular copyright provisions apply instead of the 100-year term (i.e. 50 year-terms in many cases).

A term of 100 years also applies under Section 26(3)(b), with one exception, namely a 25-year term for typographical arrangements of published material. Such works produced before 1945, however, had only a term of 50 years, and so became public domain in 1995.

At common law, and under the Copyright Acts until recently, the Crown acquired title by a kind of prerogative copyright in certain books or publications such as acts of Parliament, proclamations, and orders-in-council. However, there has been a deliberate divestment by the Crown of its copyright in law – principally in consideration of the view that law should be freely available.

Section 27(1) defines a further exception to Crown copyright and copyright: bills, acts of parliament, regulations, bylaws, Hansard, tabled select committee reports, court judgments, tribunal judgments, royal commission reports, commission of inquiry reports, ministerial inquiry reports and statutory inquiry reports do not carry any copyright, regardless of age. Section 27(1) came into effect on 1 April 2001. There is, in New Zealand, under s. 27 of the Copyright Act, 1994, no copyright in regulations. Section 27(1) exceptions apply in the original work, and do not apply in terms of new typographical editions by others, nor in annotations made by organisations such as legal publishers.

European Union
European Union countries "exempt primary source law from copyright protection, the European Union does not have a uniform law on copyright subsistence or copyright ownership of government documents and does not mandate that laws be in the public domain". The EU has also given free and open access to official government documents online for European parliament.

United Kingdom
Crown copyright applies "[w]here a work is made by His Majesty or by an officer or servant of the Crown in the course of his duties". The Crown can also have copyrights assigned to it. There is, in addition, a small class of materials where the Crown claims the right to control reproduction outside normal copyright law due to letters patent issued under the royal prerogative. This material includes the King James Bible and the Book of Common Prayer.

Prior to the 17th century, the executive – acting on behalf of the monarch under royal prerogative – controlled all printing and the granting of licences to printers. During the 17th century, the Crown lost most of its rights, except with regard to the King James Bible, the Book of Common Prayer, Acts of Parliament and similar. Until 1911, there was no special status for the Crown, excepting those texts.

The Copyright Act 1911 removed the concept of common law copyright protection from British law, and it also provided specific protection for government works for the first time. Crown copyright was extended to any work prepared or published by or under the direction or control of King George V or any government department. The Copyright Act 1956 further extended Crown copyright protection to include every original literary, dramatic, musical or artistic work made by or under the direction or control of Her Majesty or a government department; sound recordings or cinematograph films made by or under the direction or control of Her Majesty or a government department and works first published in the UK, if first published by or under the direction or control of Her Majesty or a government department.

When the Copyright, Designs and Patents Act 1988 (the 1988 Act) came into force, the scope of the definition of Crown copyright was considerably reduced. Crown copyright was defined as subsisting when a "work is made by Her Majesty or by an officer or servant of the Crown in the course of his duties". Crown copyright was also defined as subsisting "in every Act of Parliament, Act of the Scottish Parliament, Act of the Northern Ireland Assembly or Measure of the General Synod of the Church of England". All existing works in Crown copyright were continued as such.

However, some documents have Crown copyright waived by the government, subject to certain conditions. This was introduced in a white paper in 2000 in order to improve access to government publications. This listed ten classes of documents for which "formal and specific licensing will not be necessary".
  Primary and secondary legislation
  Explanatory notes to legislation
  Government press notices
  Government forms
  Government consultative documents
  Government documents featured on official departmental Web sites
  Headline statistics
  Published papers of a scientific, technical or medical nature
  Text of ministerial speeches and articles
  Unpublished public records

The duration of Crown copyright varies depending on whether material is published or unpublished. Unpublished material was originally subject to copyright protection in perpetuity. However, the 1988 Act removed this concept from British law. Transitional provisions that apply for 50 years after the entry into force of the 1988 Act provide that no unpublished material will lose its copyright protection until 1 January 2040. New Crown copyright material that is unpublished has copyright protection for 125 years from the date of creation. Published Crown copyright material has protection for 50 years from the date of publication. Those works protected under Letters Patent have perpetual control of reproduction claimed over them despite being published. Where copyright in a work is assigned to the Crown by an author it is subject to the normal term of protection for that particular type of work, for example, life of the author plus 70 years for a literary work.

Crown copyright works still in copyright may be released under the Open Government Licence by the relevant rights owner or authorised information provider.

The UK government has historically charged fees for access to some Crown copyright works in order to offset costs.

In the UK there are allowances for the use of a select amount of copyrighted works (waivers), without the need for prior permission. For materials that still require a license, there is an online application process. Like Canada, materials used must be accurately represented.

Parliamentary copyright

Acts of Parliament and works from the legislative body of the Church of England are Crown copyright. Crown copyright also formerly covered parliamentary materials, however since 1988 materials created for the House of Commons and House of Lords have a distinct status in law as being protected by parliamentary copyright.

Criticisms
Crown copyright has historically been perceived by taxpayers as depriving them of access to the very works they fund, and as prioritising funded business interests over otherwise regular citizens who cannot afford to license the works. However, the UK Government has developed a trend of automatically licensing all works published on gov.uk and The National Archives under the Open Government Licence.

Notes

See also
 Copyright status of work by the U.S. government, by contrast, most works of the United States government are legally considered to be in the public domain
 Crown land
 Official text copyright
 Parliamentary copyright

References

External links 
 Application to obtain copyright licence from Canadian government (PDF file)
 Sterling, J.A.L. Crown copyright in the United Kingdom and other Commonwealth Countries.
 Vaver, David. Copyright and the State in Canada and the United States.
 Intellectual Property Policy Group, Ministry of Economic Development, New Zealand. What Does Not Qualify for Copyright Protection? (from Copyright Protection in New Zealand).
 Ah Kit, Jonathan. Section 27 and Public Domain Page.
 Ted Tjaden, "Chapter 4: The Impact of Crown copyright on Access to Law-Related Information" (PDF file) in Access to Law-Related Information in Canada in the Digital Age.
 Crown copyright information from the Office of Public Sector Information, Queen's Printer for the United Kingdom.
 Use of information previously covered by the UK Crown copyright waiver

Canadian copyright law
United Kingdom copyright law
Commonwealth realms
Australian copyright law
New Zealand copyright law